La Fayette is a 1961 French-Italian biographical film directed by Jean Dréville and starring Pascale Audret, Jack Hawkins and Orson Welles. The film depicts the life of Gilbert du Motier, Marquis de Lafayette, in particular his role in the American War of Independence.

Cast
 Michel Le Royer - La Fayette
 Howard St. John - George Washington
 Orson Welles -  Benjamin Franklin
 Pascale Audret - Adrienne de La Fayette
 Jack Hawkins - General Cornwallis
 Liselotte Pulver - Marie Antoinette
 Folco Lulli - Le Boursier 
 Wolfgang Preiss - Baron Kalb
 Edmund Purdom - Silas Deane
 Georges Rivière - Vergennes
 Rosanna Schiaffino - Comtesse de Simiane 
 Vittorio De Sica - Aaron Bancroft
 Jacques Castelot - Duc d'Ayen
 Jean-Roger Caussimon - Maurepas
 Jean-Jacques Delbo - L'exempt

Critical reception
Allmovie wrote, "the story of a Frenchman who fought to liberate the American colonies from British rule is colorfully brought to the screen...Orson Welles gives a memorable performance as Benjamin Franklin"; while TV Guide found "the picture is weighed down by its need for spectacle, and displays little grace in its presentation. It boasts two of cinema's greatest directors as part of the cast--Welles, doing his best as Ben Franklin, and De Sica."

See also
 List of films about the American Revolution
 List of television series and miniseries about the American Revolution

References

External links

1961 films
1960s French-language films
Films directed by Jean Dréville
American Revolutionary War films
Films set in France
Italian biographical films
French biographical films
French epic films
Cultural depictions of Gilbert du Motier, Marquis de Lafayette
Cultural depictions of Benjamin Franklin
Cultural depictions of George Washington
Cultural depictions of Marie Antoinette
1960s historical films
French historical films
Italian historical films
English-language French films
English-language Italian films
1960s French films
1960s Italian films